Neil Sedaka's Greatest Hits is a 1977 compilation album consisting of the works of American pop star Neil Sedaka. It contains his most popular songs from his trilogy of Rocket albums from 1974-1976. It was released by The Rocket Record Company in the US; outside the US it was released on the Polydor label.

Track listing

Side one
 Laughter in the Rain
 Standing on the Inside
 The Immigrant
 Love Will Keep Us Together
 The Hungry Years
 That's When the Music Takes Me

Side two
 Bad Blood
 Lonely Night (Angel Face)
 Love in the Shadows
 Solitaire
 Steppin' Out
 Breaking Up Is Hard to Do (1975 version)

References 

1977 greatest hits albums
Neil Sedaka compilation albums
The Rocket Record Company albums